"Like It Like It" is a song by Norwegian pop duo Marcus & Martinus featuring vocals from American rapper Silentó. The song was released as a digital download in Norway on 19 May 2017 by Sony Music Entertainment Norway. The song peaked at number 16 on the Norwegian Singles Chart and number 48 on the Swedish Singles Chart.

Music video
A video to accompany the release of "Like It Like It" was first released onto YouTube on 21 May 2017 at a total length of two minutes and fifty-five seconds.

Track listing

Charts

Weekly charts

Release history

References

2017 singles
2017 songs
Marcus & Martinus songs